The Women's downhill competition at the FIS Alpine World Ski Championships 2021 was held on 13 February 2021.

Switzerland's Corinne Suter won the gold medal, Kira Weidle of Germany took the silver, and the bronze medalist was Lara Gut-Behrami of Switzerland.

Results
The race started at 11:00 CET (UTC+1) under clear skies.

References

Women's downhill